Neftebaza is a rural locality (a selo), one of two settlements, in addition to Antonovka, the administrative centre of the Rural Okrug, in Oktyabrsky Rural Okrug of Nyurbinsky District in the Sakha Republic, Russia. Its population as of the 2002 Census was 172.

References

Notes

Sources
Official website of the Sakha Republic. Registry of the Administrative-Territorial Divisions of the Sakha Republic. Nyurbinsky District. 

Rural localities in Nyurbinsky District